Fröbelin Palikat is a Finnish children's music band. The band was formed in 1987 by kindergarten teachers Mats Lillrank, Ari Bergström, and Hannu Mäkelä, who had met while studying at Helsingin lastentarhanopettajaopisto in 1981–1983. Timo Nuutinen joined the band later in 1987. The name Fröbelin Palikat ("Fröbel's blocks") derives from the educational toy blocks designed by German pedagogue Friedrich Fröbel.

With over 423,220 records sold, Fröbelin Palikat is one of the best-selling music artists in Finland.

Band members 
 Mats Lillrank – lead vocals, guitar
 Ari Bergström – keyboards, backing vocals
 Hannu Mäkelä – drums
 Timo Nuutinen – bass guitar, guitar, backing vocals

Discography

Albums 
 Fröbelin Palikat (1991)
 Sutsisatsi (1993)
 Sätkyukot (1994)
 Hippulat vinkumaan (1996)
 Zupadibum (1998)
 Saa tonttuilla! (2000)
 Pii-paa (2004)
 Hui hai (2009)
 Joulu joutuu (2016)
 Jee-jee 30-vee (2017)
 Lits läts (2020)

Compilations albums 
 Parhaat palat (2002)

DVD/VHS 
 Parhaat leikkilaulut 1 (VHS, 1995; DVD, 2007)
 Parhaat leikkilaulut 2 (VHS, 1996; DVD, 2007)
 Lisää leikkilauluja (VHS, 1999; DVD, 2007)
 Parhaat videot (VHS, 2003)
 Fröbelin Palikat (DVD, 2004)
 Uudet kujeet (DVD, 2007)
 Jaksaa heilua (DVD, 2012)

Other 
 Bob the Builder's Finnish theme song

References

External links 
  

Finnish children's musical groups
Musical groups established in 1987